The 1986 Skate Canada International was held in Regina, Saskatchewan on October 30 – November 1. Medals were awarded in the disciplines of men's singles, ladies' singles, pair skating, and ice dancing.

Results

Men

Ladies

Pairs

Ice dancing

References

Skate Canada International, 1986
Skate Canada International
1986 in Canadian sports 
1986 in Saskatchewan